Lincoln Beach was an amusement park in New Orleans, Louisiana, functioning from 1939 through 1965. The park was for the area's African American population during the Jim Crow era of racial segregation.

Lincoln Beach was located along the shore of Lake Pontchartrain near Little Woods, in a portion of the Eastern New Orleans section of the Ninth Ward of New Orleans that was little developed in the 1930s. The land where Lincoln Beach was located was deeded to the city by Sam Zemurray in 1938 and purchased within a year by the Orleans Levee Board. The Levee Board first designated this section as a swimming area in the lake for "colored" New Orleanians, then built out additional land in the lake for the amusement park to be built on. The park was similar to the then "whites only" Pontchartrain Beach amusement park, only on a smaller scale. It featured various rides, games, restaurants, a swimming pool in addition to lake swimming, and frequent live music performances. In the last decade, Fats Domino, Nat King Cole, The Neville Brothers, and more performed there.

Pontchartrain Beach was desegregated in 1964 and the city stopped taking care of Lincoln Beach and it soon fell into disrepair and closed in 1965.

Although there have been various proposals to redevelop the Lincoln Beach site, the decaying ruins of the park have remained vacant for decades. The history of Lincoln Beach is recounted in the book, The Land Was Ours: African American Beaches from Jim Crow to the Sunbelt South (published by Harvard University Press, 2012).

In 2020, Reggie Ford, a New Orleans artist, began cleaning up the beach. Others, like Sage Michael, have joined the clean-up effort. The beach is currently clean and being used by the community with several hundred visitors on the average weekend. New Orleans Mayor LaToya Cantrell started her own assessment of the usability of the beach and has stated she finds the beach to be unsafe in its current state. Councilmember Cyndi Nguyen is supporting the project.

References

Kahrl, Andrew W, The Land Was Ours: African American Beaches from Jim Crow to the Sunbelt South (Harvard University Press, 2012)

External links

Amusement parks in New Orleans
Defunct amusement parks in the United States
20th century in New Orleans
1939 establishments in Louisiana
1965 disestablishments in Louisiana